Enemy of the World is the fourth studio album by American rock band Four Year Strong. It is the final album to feature keyboardist Josh Lyford prior to his departure from the band in April 2011.

Release
On December 18, 2009, it was announced that the band had signed to Universal Motown Records and that their next album, Enemy of the World would be released in three months' time. "It Must Really Suck to Be Four Year Strong Right Now" is the album's first single, released in the iTunes Store on December 21, 2009. "Wasting Time (Eternal Summer)" became available for streaming on AbsolutePunk on February 11. It was announced be the album's second single, and was released on February 9, 2010. In January and February 2010, the band embarked on a US tour with support from the Bled, This Time Next Year, Title Fight and Strike Anywhere. "What the Hell Is a Gigawatt?" was made available for streaming on Purevolume on February 27, 2010.

In February and March 2010, the band performed at Soundwave festival in Australia. The vinyl edition of the album was made available to pre-order on March 2. Enemy of the World was made available for streaming through Myspace on March 4, 2010, before it was released through Decaydance and Universal Motown Records on March 9, 2010. In March and April, the band went on a US tour alongside Every Time I Die, Polar Bear Club and Trapped Under Ice. "Tonight We Feel Alive (On a Saturday)" was released to radio on May 11. A deluxe version of the album made available for streaming through Warped Tour's website on June 21, 2010, before was released on June 25, 2010. It features "Bad News Bearz" alongside acoustic versions of four of the album's tracks. "Bad News Bearz" and the acoustic versions of "Tonight We Feel Alive (On a Saturday)" and "Wasting Time (Eternal Summer)" were posted online ahead of the reissue. A music video was released for "Tonight We Feel Alive (On a Saturday)" on August 9. The group performed on the Kerrang! Tour in the UK in February 2011.

In October 2022, the band announced that a fully re-recorded version of the album is set to be released on February 17, 2023.

Reception

AbsolutePunk reviewer Drew Beringer was extremely positive in his review, saying Enemy of the World "is a pop-punk juggernaut" and tops their previous album Rise or Die Trying by far.

The album sold over 12,000 copies in its first week, debuting at number 47 on the Billboard 200.

"Wasting Time (Eternal Summer)" was nominated at the Kerrang! Awards for Best Single, but lost to "Liquid Confidence" by You Me at Six. Dead Press! featured it as number 15 on their best albums of the year list. The album was included at number 39 on Rock Sounds "The 51 Most Essential Pop Punk Albums of All Time" list.

Track listing

Original release
All songs written by Dan O'Connor and Alan Day, except where noted.

Bonus tracks

It's Not the Size of the 7-inch... It's How You Use It (EP)

Song titles
"It Must Really Suck to Be Four Year Strong Right Now" comes from a comment made by Scott Heisel of Alternative Press in a review of the Set Your Goals album This Will Be the Death of Us.
"What the Hell Is a Gigawatt?" is a line from the film Back to the Future.
"Flannel Is the Color of My Energy" is a reference to the chorus of the 311 song "Amber".
The title of the bonus track "Listen, Do You Smell Something?" is a line in the film Ghostbusters.

Chart performance

Personnel

Alan Day – lead vocals, rhythm and lead guitar 
Dan O'Connor – lead vocals, rhythm and lead guitar
Joe Weiss – bass guitar, backing vocals
Jake Massucco – drums, percussion
Josh Lyford – keyboards, synthesizer, unclean vocals

Additional personnel
 Jay Pepito (of Reign Supreme) – additional vocals  on "What the Hell Is a Gigawatt?"

Production
 Machine – producer
 John Feldmann – mixing
 Bradon Paddock & Erik Ron – mix assistants
 Joe Gastwirt – mastering
 Will Putney, Machine – engineer
 Clinton Bradley – additional synth programming
 Jeremy Comitas, Bill Purcell – editing/Pro Tools
  Pete Wentz – A&R for Decaydance Records
 Shep Goodman – A&R for Universal Motown
 Elizabeth Vago – A&R coordination
 Cliff Rigano – product manager
 Ken Kelly – illustrations
 Joe Spix – art direction & design

References
 Citations

Sources

External links

Enemy of the World at YouTube (streamed copy where licensed)

2010 albums
Four Year Strong albums
Albums with cover art by Ken Kelly (artist)
Decaydance Records albums
Universal Motown Records albums
Albums produced by Machine (producer)